Michigan Islamic Academy (MIA) is a Kindergarten through grade 12 Islamic private day school in Ann Arbor, Michigan. The school was opened in 1985.

As of 2015 it had 213 students. 75 of them lived in Ann Arbor, 52 lived in Ypsilanti, 35 in Canton, 20 in the Dearborn area, four each in Jackson and Westland, three each in Dexter, Farmington, and South Lyon, two each in Plymouth and Superior Township (Washtenaw County), and one each in Brighton, Harper Woods, Northville, Saline, Southfield, and Whitmore.

See also
 Islam in Metro Detroit

References

External links
 Michigan Islamic Academy

Private K-12 schools in Michigan
Education in Ann Arbor, Michigan
High schools in Ann Arbor, Michigan
Islamic schools in Michigan
Educational institutions established in 1985
1985 establishments in Michigan